Edward Thomas Noonan (October 23, 1861 – December 19, 1923) was an attorney and politician from Chicago, Illinois. He served in the Illinois Senate and was a member of the United States House of Representatives.

Biography
Noonan was born in Macomb, Illinois on October 23, 1861, and raised in Quincy and Chicago. He was educated in Quincy and Chicago, and studied law with Chicago attorney and judge Van H. Higgins. He attended law school at the University of Michigan while studying with Higgins, attained admission to the bar in 1882, and received his LL.B. degree in 1883.

In addition to practicing law, Noonan was active in Chicago politics as a Democrat.  From 1890 to 1894, he was a member of the Illinois Senate, and from 1893 to 1897 he served on the military staff of Governor John Peter Altgeld with the rank of colonel.  Noonan was counsel for the West Chicago Park Commission from 1893 to 1898, and as an unsuccessful candidate for Congress in 1894 and 1896.

Noonan was elected to the U.S. House in 1898, and served in the 56th United States Congress (March 4, 1899 – March 3, 1901). Noonan was not a candidate for reelection in 1900 and resumed the practice of law in Chicago.

Death and burial
Noonan died in Chicago on December 19, 1923. He was buried at St. Paul's Catholic Cemetery in Macomb.

Family
Noonan and his wife Lillian were the parents of two sons, Laurence (b. 1907) and Cato (b. 1916).

References

External links

1861 births
1923 deaths
People from Macomb, Illinois
University of Michigan Law School alumni
Democratic Party Illinois state senators
Democratic Party members of the United States House of Representatives from Illinois